Richard John Ackland (born 2 August 1958) is a New Zealand former professional rugby league footballer who played in the 1970s and 1980s, coach in the 1990s, 2000s and 2010s, and scout in the 2000s, and former cricketer in the 1980s, who works for the New Zealand Warriors in the National Rugby League. He represented New Zealand in 1983. His late uncle, Ron, also played for New Zealand.

Background
Ackland was born in Auckland, New Zealand.

Playing career
Ackland played rugby league in New Zealand in the 1980s as a forward. In 1981, he won the Lipscombe Cup while playing in the Auckland Rugby League competition for Mt Albert. He also was named man of the match in the 1981 Fox Memorial grand final, after scoring a try. In 1983, he won the Bert Humphries Memorial for best forward in the competition.

He spent the 1982-83 off-season in England with the Hunslet. In 1986, he moved to New South Wales, playing for the Murwillumbah Brothers club. In 1987, he joined Wagga Brothers as the captain-coach before returning to Mount Albert in 1989 for one last season.

Representative career
In 1983, he made his one and only appearance for the New Zealand national rugby league team, coming off the bench against Papua New Guinea. Ackland also represented Auckland and played in the 1983 draw against Hull F.C.

Cricket career
Ackland also played first-class cricket for Auckland, as a slow left-arm orthodox bowler. From six appearances he took 10 wickets at 30.50.

Coaching career

1990s
Ackland has had a long association with the Mt Albert Lions and in 1995 coached the Auckland Warriors under 16s and the Colts side in the Lion Red Cup. In 1996, he was the club's Development officer and in 1997 he was the under 19 coach.

In 1999, he was made head coach of Mount Albert and coached the Lions to the 2002 Bartercard Cup grand final victory.

Bulldogs scout
Ackland worked as a New Zealand-based scout for the Australian rugby league club the Canterbury Bulldogs where he is credited as bringing Sonny Bill Williams, Roy Asotasi and Hutch Maiava to the club

Warriors coach
In 2006, he was appointed the Assistant Coach for the New Zealand Warriors. In 2010 he was switched with Tony Iro and Ackland became the Warrior's Toyota Cup coach. The team won the grand final in 2010, the club's first grand final victory, and repeated the feat in 2011. In 2013 he announced he was stepping down from the position at the end of the year.

Representative coaching
He was the Samoan head coach and took them to the 2008 World Cup.

See also
 List of Auckland representative cricketers

References

1958 births
Living people
Auckland cricketers
Auckland rugby league team players
Cricketers from Auckland
Hunslet R.L.F.C. players
Mount Albert Lions coaches
Mount Albert Lions players
New Zealand cricketers
New Zealand national rugby league team players
New Zealand rugby league coaches
New Zealand rugby league players
New Zealand Warriors coaches
Rugby league players from Auckland
Rugby league second-rows
Samoa national rugby league team coaches
Villeneuve Leopards coaches
St Peter's College, Auckland faculty